WQJS is a radio station broadcasting a jazz format on 88.5 MHz FM in Clewiston, Florida, United States. It is owned and operated by Fort Pierce, Florida, United States. It is part of IRSC Public Media, a division of Indian River State College, alongside two other stations: WQCS (88.9 FM) and WQCP (91.1 FM) in Fort Pierce. The WQJS programming is also heard on WQCS's HD Radio subchannel.

History

On July 13, 1998, Black Media Works, Inc., was granted a construction permit for a new radio station to serve Clewiston; a license to cover for WJCB was filed almost three years later, on July 12, 2001. It served to rebroadcast the programming of WJFP (the current WQCP) in Fort Pierce.

In August 2021, Indian River State College announced it had reached a deal to purchase WJFP and its Clewiston satellite WJCB to provide a second frequency and split NPR news/talk and classical music programming in the Fort Pierce area. On September 15, WJCB changed its call sign to WQJS. On the same day, at 8:00 a.m., classic hits 88.9 HD3 "The River" began simulcasting on 91.1 and 88.5 temporarily until WQCP relaunched with new call letters on September 28. The purchase by Indian River State College of the two stations was consummated on September 27, 2021, at a price of $950,000.

References

External links
 

QJS
Radio stations established in 2001
Jazz radio stations in the United States
NPR member stations
2001 establishments in Florida
Indian River State College